This is a list of programs broadcast by SolarFlix, a Philippine free-to-air television network owned by Solar Entertainment Corporation through its subsidiary Southern Broadcasting Network. Its programming includes Turkish dramas, Latin American telenovelas, classic Filipino movies and independent Filipino films, and Hollywood and foreign acquired movies.

Current programming

Film presentation
 Late Night Delight 
 Pinoy Mega Hits 
 Reel Time 
 Sine Siesta 
 Weekend Sine Nights

Informercials
 Shop TV

Lifestyle
 Etcetera (re-run) 
 The Peep Show (re-run) 
 Stylized (re-run)

Drama
 Endless Love (season 1; re-run) 
 My Sweet Lie 
 Everywhere I Go (re-run) 
 Hayat (re-run) 
 Bubble Up 

Programming
SolarFlix
SolarFlix